Val-d'Auzon is a commune in the Aube department in north-central France. It is approximately 30 kilometres northeast of Troyes.

It was created on 1 May 1972 from the amalgamation of the communes of Auzon-les-Marais, Montangon and Villehardouin.

Population

See also
 House of Villehardouin
Communes of the Aube department
Parc naturel régional de la Forêt d'Orient

References

External links

 Pictures of Villehardouin

Communes of Aube
Aube communes articles needing translation from French Wikipedia
Populated places established in 1972